Polaca may refer to:

 Polača, two villages in Croatia
 Polacca, 17th-century sailing vessel
Polaca, in Brazilian Portuguese the word (meaning "Polish woman") became synonymous to "prostitute"